James Bowman (1784 – 23 August 1846) was an English-born Australian politician and surgeon.

He was born at Carlisle to Edward and Ann Bowman. He was a Royal Navy surgeon from 1807, having previously been an assistant surgeon, and served in the Napoleonic Wars. In 1816 he migrated to the colony of New South Wales, and in 1823 he married Mary Isabella Macarthur, daughter of John and Elizabeth Macarthur; they had five children. He was principal colonial surgeon from 1823 to 1828, when he became an inspector of colonial hospitals. From 1823 to 1825 he served in the New South Wales Legislative Council. Bowman died at Ravensworth in the Hunter Valley in 1846.

References

External links 

 Colonial Secretary's papers 1822-1877, State Library of Queensland- includes digitised correspondence letters written by Bowman to the Colonial Secretary of New South Wales on matters relating to the Moreton Bay Penal Settlement

1784 births
1846 deaths
Members of the New South Wales Legislative Council
Australian surgeons
Colonial Surgeons
19th-century Australian politicians
British people in colonial Australia